The Bienstand, in several histories and novels called the Bistand, is a low mountain ridge, 865 m high, in the Bavarian Forest between the villages of Sankt Oswald-Riedlhütte and Grafenau, immediately south of the clearly higher mountains of the Rachel and Lusen, which lie within the Bavarian Forest National Park. Its name probably comes from the Middle High German ("bien"="near" and "stand"="forest pasture", see also Kirchlinger Stand) and means "near the forest pasture".

Description 
On the flat summit plateau stands a great wooden cross. The view to the south is open and, on föhn days extends to the chain of the Alps from the Dachstein to the Kaiser Mountains. Several waymarked footpaths lead up to the Bienstand from the surrounding villages; the nearest being Reichenberg and Höhenbrunn.

References

External links 
  at regiowiki.pnp.de

Mountains under 1000 metres
Mountains of Bavaria
Mountains of the Bavarian Forest
Freyung-Grafenau